Gath y Chaves (commonly given by the Argentines as "gatichaves" ) was a department store in the downtown of the city of Buenos Aires, Argentina. Founded in 1883 by Lorenzo Chaves (1854-1928) and Alfredo Gath (1852-1936), it fell into English hands when it was bought by Harrods, and was a favorite of the city's upper class. Actress Amelia Bence worked for the store as a young girl. It finally closed in 1974. The current building is a bank.

See also
Harrods Buenos Aires

References

 Ricardo Cicerchia, Historia de la vida privada en la Argentina, vol. 2, Desde la Constitución de 1853 hasta la crisis de 1930 (Buenos Aires: Troquel Editorial, 2001)

Buildings and structures in Buenos Aires
Retailing in Argentina
1883 establishments in Argentina
Department store buildings
Harrods